William Raoul Reagle Transue (January 31, 1937 – December 17, 2008) was an American mathematician and topologist.  He is the son of mathematician William Reagle Transue and Monique Serpette who moved from her native France to the US in 1936. Bill, as he was known, earned his bachelor's degree from Harvard University in 1958, and his Ph.D. in mathematics from The University of Georgia in 1967 under Billy Joe Ball.  He was a professor of mathematics at Auburn University from 1967 until his retirement over 30 years later.

References

 

1937 births
2008 deaths
20th-century American mathematicians
21st-century American mathematicians
Harvard University alumni
University of Georgia alumni